Isotoma viridis is a species of elongate-bodied springtails in the family Isotomidae. It has a Holarctic distribution, often found in meadows and agricultural fields. The species feeds on fungal hyphae and decaying leaves.

References

External links

 

Collembola
Articles created by Qbugbot
Animals described in 1839
Holarctic fauna